Zinc finger protein 878 is a protein that in humans is encoded by the ZNF878 gene.

References

Further reading